Reisbach may refer to:

 Reisbach (Saar), a small town in Saarland, Germany
 Reisbach (Vils), a city in Bavaria, Germany in the district of Dingolfing-Landau
 Reisbach (Palatinate), a river of Alsace, France, and Rhineland-Palatinate, Germany
 Wolfsindis of Reisbach, regional saint of the Middle Ages in Bavaria

See also 
 Schachten (disambiguation)